In probability theory and statistics, the chi distribution is a continuous probability distribution.  It is the distribution of the positive square root of the sum of squares of a set of independent random variables each following a standard normal distribution, or equivalently, the distribution of the Euclidean distance of the random variables from the origin. It is thus related to the chi-squared distribution by describing the distribution of the positive square roots of a variable obeying a chi-squared distribution.

If  are  independent, normally distributed random variables with mean 0 and standard deviation 1, then the statistic

is distributed according to the chi distribution. The chi distribution has one parameter, which specifies the number of degrees of freedom (i.e. the number of random variables ).

The most familiar examples are the Rayleigh distribution (chi distribution with two degrees of freedom) and the Maxwell–Boltzmann distribution of the molecular speeds in an ideal gas (chi distribution with three degrees of freedom).

Definitions

Probability density function 
The probability density function (pdf) of the chi-distribution is

where  is the gamma function.

Cumulative distribution function
The cumulative distribution function is given by:

where  is the regularized gamma function.

Generating functions

The moment-generating function is given by:

where  is Kummer's confluent hypergeometric function. The characteristic function is given by:

Properties

Moments 
The raw moments are then given by:

where  is the gamma function. Thus the first few raw moments are:

 

where the rightmost expressions are derived using the recurrence relationship for the gamma function:

From these expressions we may derive the following relationships:

Variance:  which approaches  as  increases.

Skewness: 

Kurtosis excess:

Entropy
The entropy is given by:

where  is the polygamma function.

Large n approximation
We find the large n=k+1 approximation of the mean and variance of chi distribution. This has application e.g. in finding the distribution of standard deviation of a sample of normally distributed population, where n is the sample size.

The mean is then:

We use the Legendre duplication formula to write:
,
so that:

Using Stirling's approximation for Gamma function, we get the following expression for the mean:

And thus the variance is:

Related distributions
If  then  (chi-squared distribution)
 (Normal distribution)
If  then 
If  then  (half-normal distribution) for any 
 (Rayleigh distribution) 
 (Maxwell distribution) 
, the Euclidean norm of a standard normal random vector of with  dimensions, is distributed according to a chi distribution with  degrees of freedom
chi distribution is a special case of the generalized gamma distribution or the Nakagami distribution or the noncentral chi distribution
The mean of the chi distribution (scaled by the square root of ) yields the correction factor in the unbiased estimation of the standard deviation of the normal distribution.

See also
Nakagami distribution

References

Martha L. Abell, James P. Braselton, John Arthur Rafter, John A. Rafter, Statistics with Mathematica (1999), 237f.
Jan W. Gooch, Encyclopedic Dictionary of Polymers vol. 1 (2010), Appendix E,  p. 972.

External links
 http://mathworld.wolfram.com/ChiDistribution.html

Continuous distributions
Normal distribution
Exponential family distributions